Merrett is a surname. Notable people with the surname include:
Daniel Merrett (born 1984), Australian rules footballer in the Australian Football League and fullback for Brisbane Lions
Henry Merrett (born 1886), former Australian rules footballer
Jackson Merrett (born 1993), Australian rules football player
John Campbell Merrett (born 1909), Canadian architect whose most noteworthy work was the concept and design of Montreal's Central Station
Lara Merrett (born 1971), Australian visual artist who lives and works in Melbourne, Australia
Leo Merrett, Australian rules footballer who played in the VFL in between 1940 and 1949 for the Richmond Football Club
Mitch Merrett, Canadian record producer
Nigel Merrett (born 1940), British zoologist and ichthyologist and former director of the fish section of the British Natural History Museum
Paul Merrett, chef and TV personality based in Godalming, guest chef on Saturday Kitchen, a resident chef on Sunday Feast
Roger Merrett (born 1960), former Australian rules footballer who played in two Victorian Football League premiership sides
Thorold Merrett (born 1933), former Australian rules footballer, who played in the Victorian Football League
Zach Merrett (born 1995), Australian rules football player

See also
Merrett–Murray Medal awarded annually to the player adjudged the Brisbane Lions Club Champion of the season
Merrett R. Stierheim, public administrator in the public sector in Miami-Dade County from 1959 to 2004